The Coudekerque-Branche–Fontinettes railway runs along the English Channel and North Sea coast of France from a junction near Coudekerque-Branche station in Dunkirk to a junction near Les Fontinettes station in Calais. There is a movable bridge over the Aa at Gravelines to allow navigation of the river.

The line is used by local trains between Calais and Dunkirk.

History
The line was built by Compagnie du Nord-Est and opened 10 August 1876. Operations were transferred on 5 June 1883 to Compagnie des chemins de fer du Nord.

The whole length of the line was doubled in 1915, to be resingled along much of its length in 1960. The first ten kilometres of the line from Coudekerque was electrified in 1962 and the marshalling yard (triage de Grande-Synthe) at Grande-Sythe built between 1962 and 1965.

Plans to electrify the line were completed by 2015.

Notes

References
 
 
 

Railway lines in Hauts-de-France
Standard gauge railways in France
Railway lines opened in 1876